Korea Army Officer Candidate School (KAOCS, Hangul: 육군 학사사관, Hanja: 陸軍 學士士官) provides training to become a commissioned officer in the Republic of Korea Army. Korea Army Officer Candidate School was first proposed on 28 June 1981. Between 1981 and 2014, over 48,273 candidates were enrolled in 59 KAOCS classes and were commissioned as Second Lieutenants.

History 
On 28 June 1981, the Republic of Korea Army established the Korea Army Officer Candidate School at Army Infantry School, Gwangju, Korea. In September 1981, the first Infantry KAOCS class graduated 632 second lieutenants. Beginning with the second class in 1982, KAOCS had been trained at Korea Third Military Academy(now Korea Army Academy at Yeongcheon) due to the closing of cadet course in Korea Third Military Academy. From 2012, KAOCS have training at Army Cadet Military School, Goesan, Korea. Between 1981 and 2014, over 48,273 candidates were enrolled in 59 KAOCS classes and were commissioned as Second Lieutenants.

Qualification requirements 

A candidate of KAOCS must:
Be of good moral character
Be a citizen of the  Republic of Korea
Be a civilian college graduates
Less than 27 years old at time of commissioning
Be physically able to participate in the program of instruction
Applicants to the KAOCS go through a screening process; a written exam, an interview and health examination, and a background check.
The applicant must agree to accept a commission and serve in the Republic of Korea Army on active duty.

Training

Training 
Excluding the first week of orientation, KAOCS is a 16-week-long program for college graduates pursuing a commission in the Republic of Korea Army. KAOCS is programmed to teach basic leadership and Soldier tasks, using the Infantry battle drills found in Army Field Manual. The first five weeks of training are geared toward indoctrination. The focus is on physical training, drill and ceremonies, and standardization. The last 11 weeks of training are geared toward officership. The training consists of military history, leadership, field exercises, drill and ceremonies, and small arms training. Trainees are given ranks of officer candidate.
Orientation (1 week)
 Military custom and courtesies
Basic training (5 weeks)
 Physical training, drill and ceremonies, and standardization
Training for officership (11 weeks)
 Military history, leadership, field exercises, drill and ceremonies, and small arms training

Commission 

Upon completion of KAOCS program, graduates are commissioned as Second Lieutenants (2LT) and then attend the rest of their Officer Basic Course (OBC) which trains the new officers into their Basic Branch skills. After commissioning, they serve for three years; an individual may choose to extend his or her service past the required period in pursuit of an active military career.

Promotion 
Between 1981 and 2014, over 48,273 candidates were enrolled in 59 KAOCS classes and were commissioned as Second Lieutenants. Now, five general officers, about 3,000 senior officers, and 10,000 Junior officers serve in the Republic of Korea Army. Brigadier General Hyun-suk Jeong (3rd class), Brigadier General Sang-yun Lee (6th class), Brigadier General Hyang-hyeok Bang (5th class), Brigadier General U-gyo Jeong (6th class), and Brigadier General Yong-moon Cho (5th class) are very famous.

Notable graduates 
Members of Congress
Jong-bae Lee (1st class)
Dong-wan Kim (1st class)
Byung-hun Jeon (1st class)
Heui-kuk Kim (2nd class)
 Governors
Jeong-bok Ryu (1st class)(Mayor of Incheon)
Sung Lee (1st class)(Director General of Kuro Ward, Seoul)
Sung-il Park (1st class)(Governor of Wanju-gun)
Kwang-sil Bae (4th class)( Director General of Buk Ward, Daegu)
 University Professors
Bon-chung Ku (1st class)(President, Chungyang Univ.)
Dong-il Rho (1st class)(Prof., Kyunghee Univ.)
Dae-jeong Kim (1st class)(Prof., Chungang Univ.)
Min-cheol Choi (1st class)(Prof., Seoul National Univ.)
Yeon-ju Jeong (1st class)(Prof., Sungshin Women's Univ.)
Ho-geun Kong (1st class)(Prof., Keukdong Univ.)
Chun-han Yun (1st class)( Prof., Chosun Univ.)
Il-su Kim (1st class)( Prof., Mokpo Univ.)
Uel-hyung Lee (7th class)( Colonel, Prof., Korea Army Academy at Yeongcheon)
Lewis Hyukseung Lee (38th class)(Assistant Prof., Univ. of Alabama, United States)

 General officers
Brigadier General Hyun-suk Jeong (3rd class)
Brigadier General Sang-yun Lee (6th class)
Brigadier General Hyang-hyeok Bang (5th class)
Brigadier General U-gyo Jeong (6th class)
Brigadier General Yong-moon Cho (5th class)

See also
Officer Training School ROKAF
Korea Military Academy
Korea Army Academy at Yeongcheon

References

Training establishments of the South Korean Army
Military units and formations established in 1981